Simon Baus (1882–1969) was an American Impressionist from Indianapolis. Baus participated in the Indianapolis City Hospital project. Baus was also a member of the Irvington Group.

Career
Simon Baus began his career as an artist at the John Herron Art Institute. Baus studied under William Forsyth, J. Ottis Adams, and Otto Stark. Baus began studying with Stark as a high school student at the Emmerich Manual Training High School.
Baus became involved with the Indianapolis City Hospital project, and was a full-time artist on the project. Although Baus is best known for his portraiture, he was a significant contributor to the City Hospital project.
Baus was a member of the Irvington Group, and won numerous awards during his career.

In regards to portraiture, Baus is best known for his portraits of Senator James Eli Watson, Ferdinand Schaeffer, Dr. F.S.C. Wicks, and Emmett Forrest Branch, Indiana's 31st Governor.

Awards
The First Wanamaker Prize (1919)
J. I. Holcomb Prize (1919)
Indianapolis Art Association Award (1921)
Foulke Prize
Studebaker Prize
Hoosier Salon, Griffith and Kittle Prize

References

American Impressionist painters
American landscape painters
19th-century American painters
American male painters
20th-century American painters
Irvington Group landscape painters
Painters from Indiana
1882 births
1969 deaths
19th-century American male artists
20th-century American male artists
Herron School of Art and Design alumni